Hans Olsen may refer to:

 Hans Olsen (cyclist) (1885–1969), Danish Olympic cyclist
 Hans Olsen (fencer) (1886–1976), Danish Olympic fencer
 Hans Olsen (furniture designer) (1919–1992), Danish furniture designer 
 Hans Pauli Olsen (born 1957), Faroese sculptor

See also

Hans Olson (born 1952), American musician and songwriter,
Hans H. Olson, politician
Hans Olsson (disambiguation)
Olsen (surname)